The Top is the fifth studio album by English rock band the Cure, released on 4 May 1984 by Fiction Records. The album entered the UK Albums Chart at number ten on 12 May.  Shortly after its release, the Cure embarked on a major tour of the United Kingdom, culminating in a three-night residency at the Hammersmith Odeon in London.

Background and recording
After recording psychedelic album Blue Sunshine for the one-off project the Glove during summer 1983, Robert Smith finished off the year composing and working on two other studio albums at the same time: The Top for the Cure and Hyæna for Siouxsie and the Banshees. Smith was still the official guitarist of the Banshees while he wrote The Top.

For The Top, Smith teamed up with co-Cure founding member, Lol Tolhurst, who had given up drums for keyboards, and new drummer Andy Anderson, who had previously performed on the UK top 10 single "The Lovecats". Porl Thompson was credited for playing saxophone on "Give Me It". All the songs are credited to Smith but three tracks were co-written with Tolhurst: "The Caterpillar", "Bird Mad Girl" and "Piggy in the Mirror".

Music
The album's style is eclectic, with Smith using various instruments including violin and flute. "Bird Mad Girl" is in a Spanish style, while "Wailing Wall" contains Middle Eastern undertones. Sounds critic Jack Barron described the opening track "Shake Dog Shake" as "urbane metal".

Promotion, release and reception

Prior to its release, the Cure had been promoting the forthcoming album, performing live twice on UK television. In late February, they had played two songs on BBC Two's Oxford Road Show, "Shake Dog Shake" and "Give Me It" and in early April, they had appeared on Channel Four's The Tube to perform three other tracks, "Bananafishbones", "Piggy in the Mirror" and the title track of the record. The Top album was released on 4 May 1984 by record label Fiction. It was a commercial success in the UK, peaking at No. 10 on the UK Albums Chart. "The Caterpillar" was the sole single released from the album.

Upon its release, the reaction in the British press was mostly positive. Steve Sutherland of Melody Maker praised the album for its "psychedelia that can't be dated", while Andy Strike of Record Mirror called it "a record of wicked originality and wit". In Smash Hits, Mark Ellen deemed The Top a "weird and wonderful" album with songs that "seem both enticing and faintly dangerous". In contrast, Barron at Sounds noted that The Top is "too often not the true bottom line in reflected experience to be indisposable", but nevertheless prophesied, "In 20 years' time, when the next generation blush with excitement at the word 'Psychedelic', it'll be regarded as a classic". On a more skeptical note, NME reviewer Danny Kelly considered it self-indulgent, qualifying it as "an ambitious, difficult record".

In a retrospective review, Q writer Tom Doyle dismissed The Top as "a transitional record of forgettable songs". Thomas Inskeep of Stylus Magazine wrote that The Top "may well be the nadir of their catalog", concluding he would call it "a transitional album and leave it at that, for what came subsequently was an honest-to-goodness marvel". Chris True of AllMusic noted that while it is "an album obviously recorded under stress, drink, and drugs", Smith's ability "to fuse the paranoia and neuroses of former work with his newfound use of pop melody and outside influences" makes the record "a necessary step in the evolution of the band".

Track listing
All songs written by Robert Smith, except where noted.

Side A
"Shake Dog Shake" – 4:55
"Bird Mad Girl" (Smith, Tolhurst) – 4:05
"Wailing Wall" – 5:17
"Give Me It" – 3:42
"Dressing Up" – 2:51

Side B
"The Caterpillar" (Smith, Tolhurst) – 3:40
"Piggy in the Mirror" (Smith, Tolhurst) – 3:40
"The Empty World" – 2:36
"Bananafishbones" – 3:12
"The Top" – 6:50

Personnel
The Cure
Robert Smith – vocals, guitar, bass guitar, keyboards, organ, recorder (3), violin (6), harmonica (9), production
Lol Tolhurst – keyboards
Andy Anderson – drums, percussion

Additional musicians
Porl Thompson – saxophone (on disc 1 and 2), keyboards and guitar (on Live tracks on disc 2)
Phil Thornalley – bass guitar (on Live tracks on disc 2)

Production
 Dave Allen – production, engineering
 Chris Parry – production
 Howard Gray – engineering

Charts

Certifications

References

External links
 

The Cure albums
1984 albums
Albums produced by David M. Allen
Fiction Records albums
Sire Records albums
Rhino Records albums